The men's pole vault event at the 2003 All-Africa Games was held on October 14.

Results

References
Results
Results

Pole